118th Brigade may refer to:

 118th Mixed Brigade (Spain)
 118th Brigade (United Kingdom)
 118th Mechanized Infantry Brigade (People's Republic of China)
 118th Territorial Defense Brigade (Ukraine)

See also

 118th Division (disambiguation)
 118th Regiment (disambiguation)